Ivan Moody is a composer born in London, England, in 1964. He studied composition with at London University, York University and privately with John Tavener. He also studied Eastern Orthodox theology at the University of Joensuu in Finland. Moody is active as a conductor, having directed ensembles such as Voces Angelicae, the Kastalsky Chamber Choir (United Kingdom), Capilla Peña Florida (Spain), Cappella Romana (United States), the Choir of the Cathedral of St George, Novi Sad, (Serbia) the KotorArt Festival Choir (Montenegro), the Orthodox Choir of the University of Joensuu (Finland) and Ensemble Alpha (Portugal); and as a widely published musicologist.  His research interests include the music of Eastern Europe, especially 20th century and contemporary music from Russia and the Balkans, the music of the Orthodox Church in the modern era, music and spirituality, music as theology, Serbian church music, the aesthetics of Modernism and Postmodernism and their intersection with Orthodox church music and the musical culture of the Mediterranean.

Work from the 1980s and 1990s 

Moody's compositions show the influences of Eastern liturgical chant and the Eastern Orthodox Church, of which he is a member (he is a protopresbyter of the Ecumenical Patriarchate of Constantinople)). His Canticum Canticorum I, written for the Hilliard Ensemble and premiered in 1987, achieved enormous success and remains his most frequently-performed work, and in 1990 he won the Arts for the Earth Festival Prize for Prayer for the Forests, subsequently premièred by the renowned Tapiola Choir of Finland.  One of his most important works is the oratorio Passion and Resurrection (1992), based on Orthodox liturgical texts, premièred in 1993 by Red Byrd and the Estonian Philharmonic Chamber Choir under Tõnu Kaljuste at the Tampere Festival.  In 1996 it was given its North American premiere by Cappella Romana. The Akáthistos Hymn (1998), the composer’s largest work to date, and the first complete musical setting of this text, was written for Cappella Romana following these performances.

Other significant works include the ‘cello concerto Epitaphios (1993), the cantata Revelation (1995), Endechas y Canciones (1996), the recorder concerto Pnevma (1998), Lamentations of the Myrrhbearer (2001) for string quartet, Lumière sans déclin (2000) for string orchestra, and the choral triptych written for Trio Mediaeval - Words of the Angel (1998), Troparion of Kassiani (1999), A Lion’s Sleep (2002), and Chalice of Wisdom, using a text from Matins of the Feast of St Thomas, written in 2002 for the ensemble amarcord.

Work from the 2000s 

Later compositions include a large-scale BBC commission, The Dormition of the Virgin (2003), concertos for double-bass (The Morning Star, 2003), piano (Linnunlaulu, 2003) and bassoon (Arise, 2004), Passione Popolare, built on popular religious texts from Magna Graecia and premièred at the Antidogma Festival in Italy in June 2005, and Ossetian Requiem, written for the Amsterdam-based ‘Cello Octet Conjunto Ibérico.  In 2008, he completed a new work for the King's Singers, "Canti della Rosa" and a large-scale setting of the Stabat Mater, incorporating texts from the Byzantine liturgy and by Anna Akhmatova, for the Oslo International Festival of Church Music. His 2009 Hymn to St Nicholas for eight voices was commissioned for the KotorArt Festival in Montenegro, where it was premiered under the composer's direction, and received its American premiere in November of that year.

Works completed in 2010 include Canticum Canticorum IV, a commission from Seattle Pro Musica, Angelus Domini descendit, a commission from the Choir of Royal Holloway, University of London and Sub tuum praesidium, a commission from the English Chamber Choir.  2011 saw the completion of a sequence of music for Byzantine-rite vespers for the Children's Choir of St Vladimir's Orthodox Theological Seminary in New York and Ode 8 of the Paschal Canon, part of a multi-composer work commissioned by Cappella Romana.  Recently completed works include "Simeron", for the Goeyvaerts Trio, recorded on Challenge CC72616), "Keskiyö" for two harpsichords, "Shoreline" for two pianos, "Dragonfly", a bass clarinet concerto for Luís Gomes and the Grupo de Música Contemporânea de Lisboa, "Fioriture" for American pianist Paul Barnes (recorded on Orange Mountain OMM0107), "Qohelet" for the Italian ensemble De Labyrinto, the "Dante Trilogy" for choir and ensemble, and "O Isplendor", in memory of John Tavener, for Cappella Nova, recorded on Linn Records CKD 539.

In October 2014 he was in residence at Biola University in Southern California, where he gave a series of masterclasses and lectures. The concluding monographic concert ended with the world premiere of "Cielo della Luna", the third part of the "Dante Trilogy", commissioned by the Biola Conservatory of Music. The first part of the Trilogy, "O Luce Etterna", was a commission from the Alcobaça Festival for the Capela Musical Cupertino de Miranda, and the second, "Oltre la Spera", was written for the Grupo de Música Contemporânea de Lisboa and the Grupo Musical Olisipo and first performed, as was the bass clarinet concerto "Dragonfly", at the composer's 50th Birthday concert at the Palácio Foz in Lisbon on 27 June 2014. In 2016 was Composer in Residence at the Stimmwercktage in Adlersberg, Germany.

Recent work (2016-present) 

Recent works include "Los Espejos de Velázquez" for the pianist Artur Pizarro (premiered in Vila Nova de Gaia in July 2016), "Paris, 7 am" (soprano and piano quintet) for soprano Suzie LeBlanc (premiered by Suzie LeBlanc and the Blue Engine, Robert Korgaard and the Blue Engine Quartet, Toronto, December 2016), "Le Vergine" for Stimmwerck (premiered at the Stimmwercktage, Adlersberg, June 2016), "Vespers Sequence" for New York Polyphony, premiered at St Mary the Virgin, New York, January 2017), "Psalm Antiphon", using the same scoring as Stravinsky's "Symphony of Psalms", commissioned by the Chamber Choir of Lisbon University and premiered on 13 July 2017 in Lisbon, "Psalm 1" and "Antiphon for Psalm 1", commissioned for Singer Pur and the Regensburger Domspatz and "Amorphous Metal" for the Trio Entremadeiras, premiered in Guarda, 9 February 2018. Works completed between 2018 and 2020 include "Isangele" for the English Chamber Choir, premiered at the Patmos Festival in August 2018, three motets on texts from the Codex Las Huelgas and the Byzantine rite for Trio Mediaeval, premiered in Oslo in October 2018, "Taninim" for tuba and piano, premiered by Sofia Moody and Pedro Vieira de Almeida at the Gravissimo Festival in Alcobaça in August 2019, the large-scale oratorio "Stephans-Weihnacht", commissioned by Singer Pur and St Stephen's Church, Therwil (premiered in December 2019), "Transfiguration", premiered by Voces8 and Intrada in Moscow in January 2020, and "Piano Book", comprising seventeen pieces for different pianists (2020), and "Bird in Space" (2020) for the saxophonist Amy Dickson.

Academic profile 

As of 1990, he has lived near Lisbon, Portugal, where he was until 1998 Professor of Composition at the Academia de Artes e Tecnologias, Lisbon. He has been involved in the construction of a database for the Portuguese Contemporary Music Centre, was a Research Fellow of the CESEM research unit at the Universidade Nova in Lisbon 2010–2012 ( and again from 2015, and was Professor of Church Music of the Department of Orthodox Theology at the University of Eastern Finland from 2013-2014.  In 2005 he was elected the first Chairman of the International Society for Orthodox Church Music (ISOCM). His book "Modernism and Orthodox Spirituality in Contemporary Music" was published in 2014 by ISOCM/SASA.

Ivan Moody’s music is recorded on the Hyperion, ECM, Sony, Challenge, Telarc, Gothic, Oehms, Orange Mountain, Linn and Cappella Romana labels.

Partial list of works
 1982: "Three Poems of Anna Akhmatova", for soprano or tenor and string sextet
 1985: Canticum Canticorum I, for vocal ensemble
 1987: "Canticle of the Mother of God", for choir
 1988: "Hymn of the Transfiguration", for choir
 1988  "Miserere", for choir
 1990: Prayer for the Forests, for choir
 1992: Passion and Resurrection, oratorio, for soloists, choir and ensemble
 1992: Vigil of the Angels for viola and string orchestra
 1993: Epitaphios, concerto for cello
 1995: Revelation, cantata, for choir and ensemble
 1996: Endechas y Canciones, for vocal ensemble
 1996: Klama for viola and double bass
 1998: The Akathistos Hymn, for choir
 1998: Pnevma, concerto for recorder
 1998: Words of the Angel, for choir
 1999: Troparion of Kassiani, for choir
 2000: Lumière sans déclin, for string orchestra
 2001: Lamentations of the Myrrhbearers, for string quartet
 2002: A Lion's Sleep, for choir
 2002: Chalice of Wisdom for choir 
 2003: The Dormition of the Virgin, cantata for soloists, choir and ensemble
 2003: The Morning Star, concerto for double-bass
 2003: Linnunlaulu, concerto for piano
 2004: Arise, concerto for bassoon
 2005: Passione Popolare, for soloists, choir and ensemble
 2009: Hymn to Saint Nicholas, for choir
 2010: "Canticum Canticorum IV", for choir
 2010: "Sub tuum praesidium", for choir
 2011: "Vespers", for upper voices
 2012: "The Paschal Canon: Ode VIII", for choir
 2012: "Te lucis ante terminum", for choir
 2012: "Noć Prekrasna", for choir
 2012: "Simeron", for vocal trio and string trio
 2012: "Shoreline", for two pianos
 2013: "Keskiyö", for two harpsichords
 2013: "Dragonfly", for solo bass clarinet and ensemble
 2013: "Fioriture", for solo piano
 2014: "Liturgy of St John Chrysostom no. 2 (Greek Liturgy)", for choir
 2014: "O Luce Etterna (Dante Trilogy Part I)"
 2014: "Oltre la Spera (Dante Trilogy Part II)"
 2014: "Cielo della Luna (Dante Trilogy Part III)"
 2015: "The Descent of the Dove", for violin, cello and piano
 2015: "Uspomena" for two tubas and piano
 2015: "...grace upon her heart..." for choir
 2015: "Los Espejos de Velázquez" for piano
 2016: "Paris, 7 a.m." for soprano and piano quartet
 2016: "Albor" for harpsichord and recorder quartet
 2016: "Le Vergine" for vocal consort and viol consort
 2016: "Vespers Sequence" for vocal ensemble
 2016: "Iterazioni", concerto for marimba
 2017: "Psalm Antiphon" for choir and orchestra
 2017: "Psalm 1" for choir
 2017: "Antiphon for Psalm 1" for choir
 2017: "Perchoresis" for flute trio
 2017: "Amorphous Metal" for wind trio
 2017: "Exaposteilarion for Theophany" for choir
 2018: "Isangele (John on Patmos)" for choir
 2018: "Three Motets (Ave Maris Stella; O Maria Maris Stella/Ti Theotoko; Resurgentis/Dhefte lavete/Christos anesti) for vocal ensemble 
 2018: "Tanninim" for tuba and piano
 2018: "Transfiguration" for vocal ensemble and choir
 2019: "Imperaytriz de la Ciutat Joyosa" for organetto
 2019: "O Angels and Archangels" for soprano, cornetto and bass viol
 2019: "Stephans-Weihnacht" for soloists, choir and ensemble
 2020: "Piano Book" for piano
 2020: "Wingtip Vortex" for flute
 2020: "Civitas Sancti" for vocal ensemble
 2020: "Bird in Space" for soprano saxophone

Selected recordings 

 Aflame, He Who clotherd Himself with Light, Moons and Suns NDR Choir, Raschèr Saxophone Quartet C2 Hamburg Es Dur ES 2081
 Akáthistos Hymn Cappella Romana CR418-2CD
 A Lion's Sleep ECM New Series 1869
 Apokathilosis Raumklang Rkap 10117
 Canticum Canticorum I ECM New Series 1614/15
 Canticum Canticorum I Atma Classique ACD2 2284
 Chalice of Wisdom CD "Prinos euharistic", Theological Faculty, Iași
 Endechas y Canciones ECM New Series 1614/15
 Fioriture Orange Mountain Music OMM 0107
 Imperaytriz de la ciutat joyosa Consouling Sounds SOUL0139
 Lamentation of the Virgin Oehms Classics OC 354
 Passion & Resurrection Hyperion CDA 66999
 Ravenna Sanctus Warner Classics R2 146364
 Simeron Channel Classics CC 72616
 Supplication for Peace Oehms Classics OC1714
 Te Apostolit Cappella Romana CR 412-CD
 Troparion of Kassiana ECM New Series 1869
 When Augustus Reigned Naxos 9.70039
 Words of the Angel ECM New Series 1753

References

External links
 
 Ivan Moody
 academia.edu
 CESEM
 UEF
 Doctoral thesis by Kevin Coker on the music of Ivan Moody

1964 births
Living people
English Eastern Orthodox Christians
Members of the Orthodox Church of Finland
21st-century classical composers
Classical composers of church music
20th-century classical composers
Male classical composers